Henri-Chapelle is a village of Wallonia and a district of the municipality of Welkenraedt, located in the province of Liège,  Belgium.

It is located 17 kilometers south-west of the spa and border city of Aachen.

Henri-Chapelle was its own municipality until January 1, 1977 when it was merged with Welkenraedt as part of the fusion of the Belgian municipalities. Its postal code is 4841.

War graves
 north of the town, at Vogelsang-Hombourg, is the Henri-Chapelle American Cemetery and Memorial, which contains the graves of 7,992 members of the American military who died in World War II.

Other historic sites and monuments 

 Saint-Georges church (Gothic architecture with a Roman tower)
 Baelen castle
 Ruyff castle

Nut fair
Every autumn for the past 260 years, Henri-Chapelle has hosted a nut fair.

References

External links
 

Welkenraedt
Former municipalities of Liège Province